Iban Zubiaurre Urrutia (born 22 January 1983) is a Spanish former footballer who played as a right-back.

Club career
Zubiaurre was born in Mendaro, Gipuzkoa. After making his Real Sociedad first-team debut during the 2004–05 season, he achieved notoriety as a result of a lawsuit in which his first club prevented him from playing for Athletic Bilbao for 14 months, due to an alleged illegality in his transfer between the two Basque sides.

Zubiaurre, who represented Real Sociedad at youth level, was 'presented' as new Athletic Bilbao player in 2005 by the latter's president Fernando Lamikiz, despite still being under contract. He had no permission to rescind his link, which had a year left to run and a buy-out clause of €33 million (the former club had activated a one-season optional extension to his contract, while the latter asserted that he was a free agent). Real insisted that Athletic pay the entire amount, with the player not being allowed to play professional football during the subsequent legal battle; SCD Durango, a regional club, asked permission to field him, but were denied.

Fifteen months after the lawsuit began, a judge ruled that Athletic had to pay Real Sociedad €5 million, and were granted permission to field Zubiaurre for the 2006–07 campaign. He was presented for a second time at San Mamés Stadium on 16 November 2006, and was given the number 12 shirt.

On 11 February 2007, Zubiaurre played his first La Liga match for Athletic, appearing against Atlético Madrid as a substitute in a 1–0 away defeat. That was to be his only game of the season, in which his team avoided relegation on the very last matchday.

Zubiaurre also only featured once in 2007–08, in a 2–0 loss at Getafe CF on 31 October 2007. After almost two years in the sidelines, he left in order to gain more playing time, joining Segunda División side Elche CF on a season-long loan.

Returned to Athletic for the 2009–10 campaign, Zubiaurre's season input consisted of 15 minutes against FK Austria Wien (3–0 win at home) in the UEFA Europa League group stage. In July 2010 another loan ensued, also in the second tier, as he signed with Albacete Balompié.

Zubiaurre was deemed surplus to requirements in 2011–12 after the appointment of manager Marcelo Bielsa, alongside teammates Koikili and Aitor Ocio. He remained with the team, however.

Zubiaurre was loaned to UD Salamanca in the Segunda División B for the 2012–13 season. He moved to Racing de Santander in August 2013, being waived after only one month and no matches played.

Honours
Spain U19
UEFA European Under-19 Championship: 2002

References

External links

1983 births
Living people
People from Debabarrena
Spanish footballers
Footballers from the Basque Country (autonomous community)
Association football defenders
La Liga players
Segunda División players
Segunda División B players
Tercera División players
Real Sociedad B footballers
Real Sociedad footballers
Athletic Bilbao footballers
Elche CF players
Albacete Balompié players
UD Salamanca players
Racing de Santander players
Spain youth international footballers
Spain under-21 international footballers
Association football controversies